Christian Friedrich Hornschuch (21 August 1793 – 24 December 1850) was a German botanist born in Rodach, Bavaria.

In 1808 he started his career as an apprentice at a pharmacy in Hildburghausen. In 1813 he moved to Regensburg as an assistant to botanist David Heinrich Hoppe (1760–1846), and afterwards worked as an assistant to Heinrich Christian Funck (1771–1839) in Gefrees, where he performed research of mosses (Bryopsida) native to the Fichtelgebirge. 

In 1816 he accompanied Hoppe on a botanical expedition to the Adriatic coast, then returned to Coburg to arrange his diaries, and in April 1817 continued his research with Hoppe in Tyrol and Carinthia. Later he worked as a "botanical demonstrator" at the University of Greifswald, and for a period of time studied with Carl Adolph Agardh (1785–1859) from the University of Lund.

In 1820 he was appointed associate professor of natural history and botany, and director of the botanical gardens at the University of Greifswald. In 1827, he attained the title of "full professor".

In 1821, botanist Christian Gottfried Daniel Nees von Esenbeck named a genus of flowering plants (in family Annonaceae) from Brazil as Hornschuchia.

Publications 
Hornschuch specialized in the field of bryology, and with botanist Christian Gottfried Daniel Nees von Esenbeck (1776–1858) and engraver Jacob Sturm (1771–1848), he was co-author of Bryologia Germanica (1823–31). He translated a number of Danish and Swedish works, and was the author of the following publications:
 Tagebuch auf einer Reise nach den Küsten des adriatischen Meeres (Diary of a journey to the shores of the Adriatic Sea), 1818 
 De Voitia et Systolio. novis muscorum frondosorum generibus (1818)
 Flora oder botanische Zeitung, founded with David Heinrich Hoppe as a publication of the Royal Bavarian Botanical Society of Regensburg
 Einige Beobachtungen über die Entstehung und Metamorphose der niederen vegetabilischen Organismen (Some observations on the formation and metamorphism of the lower vegetable organisms). In: Flora (1819) 
 with David Heinrich Hoppe, Jacob Sturm and Jacob Johann Hagenbach Insecta coleoptrata, quae in itineribus suis, prasertim Alpinis, collegerunt (1825)

References 
 This article is based on a translation of the equivalent article from the German Wikipedia.
 University of Bonn, Bryology
 Botanical Database, C.F.Hornschuch

19th-century German botanists
German entomologists
Bryologists
Academic staff of the University of Greifswald
1793 births
1850 deaths